is a passenger railway station  located in  Nada-ku, Kobe, Hyōgo Prefecture, Japan. It is operated by the West Japan Railway Company (JR West).

Lines

Station layout
The station consists of two island platforms connected by an elevated station building; however, only the inner tracks are normally used, with the outer tracks reserved for passing express trains except during peak commuting hours. The station is staffed.

Platforms

History
Nada Station opened on 1 December 1917. With the privatization of the Japan National Railways (JNR) on 1 April 1987, the station came under the aegis of the West Japan Railway Company. 

Station numbering was introduced in March 2018 with Nada being assigned station number JR-A60.

Passenger statistics
In fiscal 2019, the station was used by an average of 20,677 passengers daily

Surrounding area
Kobe Municipal Oji Zoo
Kobe Literature Museum
Kobe Municipal Oji Sports Center (including Oji Stadium)
BB Plaza Museum of Art
Hyogo Prefectural Museum of Art
WHO Kobe Center and the Disaster Reduction and Human Renovation Institution (which houses a museum commemorating the Great Hanshin Earthquake)

See also
List of railway stations in Japan

References

External links 

 Nada Station from JR-Odekake.net 

Railway stations in Japan opened in 1917
Tōkaidō Main Line
Railway stations in Kobe